Euderces andersoni is a species of beetle in the family Cerambycidae. It was described by Giesbert and Chemsak in 1997 and is known from Guerrero in southern Mexico. It is named for Robert S. Anderson from the Canadian Museum of Nature in Ottawa.

References

Euderces
Beetles of North America
Insects of Mexico
Beetles described in 1997